Hybothecus is a genus of beetles in the family Carabidae, containing the following species:

 Hybothecus aequatorius (Chaudoir, 1878)
 Hybothecus aequidianus (Moret, 1997)
 Hybothecus anomalus (Chaudoir, 1878)
 Hybothecus flohri (Bates, 1882)
 Hybothecus incrassatus Chaudoir, 1874
 Hybothecus mateui (Straneo, 1958)
 Hybothecus sculptilis (Putzeys, 1878)

References

Pterostichinae